"Far, Far, Away on Judea's Plains" was originally written for an 1869 Christmas program in St. George, Utah, when John Menzies Macfarlane desired a new song for his choir.<ref name="ardis">"John Menzies Macfarlane: Far, Far Away and Not So Long Ago" by Ardis Parshall, Keepapitchinin, Dec. 14, 2008. Accessed May 21, 2012.</ref>

"Far, Far, Away on Judea's Plains" was first published in the Juvenile Instructor'' on December 15, 1889. The hymn has since become one of the few hymns of The Church of Jesus Christ of Latter-day Saints to become accepted in the broader Christian community.

The hymn's accompanying melody, "Chatterley," was also written by Macfarlane.

References

Songs about Israel
Christmas carols
Latter Day Saint hymns
1869 songs
Works originally published in American magazines
Judea